This is an incomplete list of writers, cartoonists and others known for involvement in satire – humorous social criticism. They are grouped by era and listed by year of birth. Included is a list of modern satires.

Under Contemporary, 1930-1960

P.J. O'Rourke
Joe Queenan

Early satirical authors
Aesop (c. 620–560 BCE, Ancient Greece) – Aesop's Fables
Diogenes (c. 412–323 BCE, Ancient Greece)
Aristophanes (c. 448–380 BCE, Ancient Greece) – The Frogs, The Birds, and  The Clouds
Gaius Lucilius (c. 180–103 BCE, Roman Republic)
Horace (65–8 BCE, Roman Republic) – Satires
Ovid (43 BCE – 17 CE, Roman Republic/Roman Empire) – The Art of Love
Seneca the Younger (c. 4 BCE – 65 CE, Hispania/Rome) – Apocolocyntosis
Persius (34–62 CE, Roman Empire)
Petronius (c. 27–66 CE, Roman Empire) – Satyricon
Juvenal (1st to early 2nd cc. CE, Roman Empire) – Satires
Lucian (c. 120–180 CE, Roman Empire)
Apuleius (c. 123–180 CE, Roman Empire) – The Golden Ass
Various authors (9th century CE and later) – One Thousand and One Nights, أَلْفُ لَيْلَةٍ وَلَيْلَةٌ

Medieval, early modern and 18th-century satirists
Godfrey of Winchester (died 1107, England)
Ubayd Zakani (عبید زاکانی, died 1370, Persia) – Akhlaq al-Ashraf (Ethics of the Aristocracy)
Giovanni Boccaccio (1313–1375, Italy) – The Decameron
James Bramston (1694–1743, England) – satirical poet
Geoffrey Chaucer (c. 1343–1400, England) – The Canterbury Tales
Sebastian Brant (also Brandt) (1458 – 1521, Strasbourg) – Das Narrenschiff (Ship of Fools)
Gil Vicente (c. 1465–1536, Portugal)
Erasmus (1466–1536, Burgundian Netherlands/Switzerland) – The Praise of Folly
François Rabelais (c. 1493–1553, France) – Gargantua and Pantagruel
Various authors (16th century CE and later, Italy) – Talking statues of Rome
Miguel de Cervantes (1547–1616, Spain) – Don Quixote
Luis de Góngora (1561–1627, Spain)
William Shakespeare (1564–1616, England) – Sonnet 130
Francisco de Quevedo (1580–1645, Spain)
Juan de Tassis, 2nd Count of Villamediana (1582–1622, Spain)
Martin Marprelate (true identity unknown, fl. 1588–1589, England) – Marprelate tracts
Samuel Butler (1612–1680, England) – Hudibras
Molière (1622–1673, France) – Le Malade imaginaire
Margaret Cavendish, Duchess of Newcastle-upon-Tyne (1623–1673, England) 
John Wilmot, 2nd Earl of Rochester (1647–1680, England)
Jonathan Swift (1667–1745, Ireland/England) – Gulliver's Travels, A Modest Proposal, A Tale of a Tub
Alicia D'Anvers [née Clarke] (baptised 1668 – 1725, England) – Academia, or, The Humours of the University of Oxford, 1691; The Oxford-Act, 1693
John Gay (1685–1732, England) – The Beggar's Opera
Alexander Pope (1688–1744, England)
Voltaire (1694–1778, France) – Candide
James Bramston (1694–1744, England)
William Hogarth (1697–1764, England) – Beer Street and Gin Lane
Nicholas Amhurst (1697–1742, England)
David Raphael ben Abraham Polido
Henry Fielding (1707–1754, England)
Laurence Sterne (1713–1768, Ireland/England) – The Life and Opinions of Tristram Shandy, Gentleman
James Beresford (1764–1840, England) – The Miseries of Human Life
Ivan Krylov (1769–1844, Russia)
Jane Austen (1775–1817, England) – 
Thomas Love Peacock (1785–1866, England) – Nightmare Abbey, Crochet Castle
Eaton Stannard Barrett (1786–1820, Ireland) – The Heroine
Charles Etienne Boniface (1787–1853, France/South Africa) – De Nieuwe Ridderorde of De Temperantisten (in Dutch, The New Knighthood or the Temperance Societies)
Giuseppe Gioachino Belli – (1791–1863, Italy)
Benjamin Franklin - (1706-1790, US) - Silence Dogood Letters, On Titles of Honor, The Busy-Body Letters, A Witch Trial at Mount Holly, Poor Richard's Almanack, Join, or Die, Felons and Rattlesnakes, The Speech of Polly Baker, On the Slave-Trade

Modern satirists (born 1800–1900)
Evan Bevan (1803–1866, Wales) – satirical poetry in Welsh
Nikolai Gogol (1809–1852, Russia) – The Government Inspector, Dead Souls
Edgar Allan Poe (1809–1849, US) – The Man That Was Used Up, A Predicament, Never Bet the Devil Your Head
William Makepeace Thackeray (1811–1863, England) – Vanity Fair
Charles Dickens (1812–1870, England) – Hard Times, A Tale of Two Cities
James Russell Lowell (1819–1891, US) – A Fable for Critics
George Derby, also known as John P. Squibob and John Phoenix (1823–1861, US)
Mikhail Saltykov-Shchedrin (1826–1889, Russia)
Lewis Carroll (1832–1898, England) – Alice in Wonderland, Through the Looking Glass
Samuel Butler (1835–1902, England) – Erewhon
Mark Twain (1835–1910, US) – Adventures of Huckleberry Finn, A Connecticut Yankee in King Arthur's Court, The Celebrated Jumping Frog of Calaveras County
W. S. Gilbert (1836–1911, England)
Narushima Ryūhoku (成島柳北, 1837–1884, Japan)
Thomas Nast (1840–1902, US)
Ambrose Bierce (1842 – c. 1914, US) – The Devil's Dictionary
Anatole France (1844–1924, France)
José Maria de Eça de Queirós (1845–1900, Portugal)
Oscar Wilde (1854–1900, Ireland/England) – The Importance of Being Earnest
George Bernard Shaw (1856–1950, England)
Jerome K. Jerome (1859–1927, England) – Three Men in a Boat, Idle Thoughts of an Idle Fellow
Anton Chekhov (1860–1904, Russia) – The Lady with the Dog
O. Henry (1862–1910, US) short story writer known for surprise endings, namesake of the O. Henry Award
Jalil Mammadguluzadeh (1866–1931, Azerbaijan)
Lakshminath Bezbaroa (1868–1938, India, writing in Assamese)
Saki, also known as H. H. Munro (1870–1916, England)
Trilussa (1873–1950, Italy)
Alfred Jarry (1873–1907, France) – Ubu Roi
Radoje Domanović (1873–1908, Serbia)
Iraj Mirza (ایرج میرزا, 1874–1926, Iran)
Karl Kraus (1874–1936, Austria)
Will Rogers (1879–1935, US)
James Branch Cabell (1879–1958, US)
Ali-Akbar Dehkhoda (علی‌اکبر دهخدا, 1879–1959, Iran)
H. L. Mencken (1880–1956, US) – cultural critic and author
Arkady Averchenko (1881–1925, Russia)
P. G. Wodehouse (1881–1975, England/US)
Wyndham Lewis (1882–1957, England)
Jaroslav Hašek (1883–1923, Austria-Hungary/Czechoslovakia) – The Good Soldier Švejk
Oscar Cesare (1885–1948, Sweden/US)
Charlie Chaplin (1889-1977, England) – Modern Times, The Great Dictator, Monsieur Verdoux
Kurt Tucholsky (1890–1935, Germany)
Mikhail Bulgakov (1891–1940, Russia/Soviet Union) – Heart of a Dog, The Master and Margarita
Dorothy Parker (1893–1967, US) satirical writer of humorous short stories, poetry and book reviews
Vladimir Mayakovsky (1893–1930, Russia/Soviet Union)
Aldous Huxley (1894–1963) – Point Counter Point, Brave New World
James Thurber (1894-1961, US) – "The Secret Life of Walter Mitty"
Mikhail Zoshchenko (1894–1958, Soviet Union)
Josep Pla (1897–1981, Spain [Catalonia])
Ilf and Petrov: Ilya Ilf (1897–1937, Soviet Union) and Yevgeni Petrov (1903–1942, Soviet Union) – The Twelve Chairs, The Little Golden Calf
Yury Olesha (1899–1960, Soviet Union) – Three Fat Men, Envy

Modern satirists (born 1900–1930)
Stella Gibbons (1902–1989, England) – author of comic novel Cold Comfort Farm
Evelyn Waugh (1903–1966, England) – Brideshead Revisited, Decline and Fall, Scoop
George Orwell (1903–1950, England) – Animal Farm, Nineteen Eighty-Four
Malcolm Muggeridge (1903–1990, England)
Dr. Seuss (1904–1991, US) – The Lorax (1971), The Butter Battle Book (1984)
Kurt Kusenberg (1904–1983, Germany)
Daniil Kharms (1905–1942, Russia/USSR)
H. F. Ellis (1907–2000, England) – The Papers of A. J. Wentworth, B.A., 1949
Jean Effel (1908–1982, France) – cartoonist, author of the cartoon cycle The Creation of the World
Al Capp (1909–1979, US)
Arkady Raikin (1911–1987, Russia/USSR) – stand-up comedian
Aubrey Menen (1912–1989, Britain, India) – satirist, novelist and philosopher
Walt Kelly (1913–1973, US)
Anthony Burgess (1917–1993, England) – A Clockwork Orange
Warrington Colescott (1921–2018, US) 
Kurt Vonnegut (1922–2007, US) – Slaughterhouse-Five, Breakfast of Champions, Cat's Cradle
Lenny Bruce (1925–1966, US) – stand-up comedian
Joseph Heller (1923–1999, US) – Catch-22
Art Buchwald (1924–2007) – political humor column in The Washington Post
Terry Southern (1924–1995, US) – The Magic Christian, Dr. Strangelove
Günter Grass (1927–2015, Germany) – The Tin Drum, Cat and Mouse
Stanley Kubrick (1928–1999, US) – Dr. Strangelove
Harvey Kurtzman (1924–1993, US)
Tom Lehrer (born 1928, US) – That Was the Year That Was
Jules Feiffer (1929, US) – satirical cartoonist who wrote the original play and screenplay for Little Murders
Ray Bradbury (US)
William S. Burroughs (US) – Naked Lunch
Dario Fo (Italy)
Flannery O'Connor (US)
C. Northcote Parkinson (England)
Anna Russell (England/Canada)
Gore Vidal (US) – Myra Breckinridge
Mel Brooks (US) – The Producers, Blazing Saddles, Young Frankenstein
Erma Bombeck (1927, US)
Allan Sherman (1924–1973, US) – musician, parodist, television producer, voice actor
Stan Freberg (1926, US) – musician, parodist, voice actor
Brian O'Nolan (1911–1966, Ireland) – At Swim-Two-Birds (as Flann O'Brien)
Ephraim Kishon (1924, Israel)
Jerry Lewis (1926-2017) (US) – comedian, screenwriter, director

Contemporary satirists (born 1930–1960)
Mordecai Richler (1931–2001, Canada)
Tom Wolfe (born 1931, US) – The Bonfire of the Vanities
Vladimir Voinovich (born 1932, Soviet Union/Russia) – The Life and Extraordinary Adventures of Private Ivan Chonkin, Moscow 2042 
Robert Anton Wilson (1932–2007, US) – The Illuminatus! Trilogy
Barry Humphries (born 1934, Australia) – My Gorgeous Life, The Life and Death of Sandy Stone, stage shows
Jonathan Miller (1934–2019, England)
Alan Bennett (born 1934, England)
Mykhailo Zhvanetskyi (born 1934, Soviet Union/Russia)
Dudley Moore (1935–2002, England)
David Lodge (born 1935, US) – author of "Campus Trilogy"
Woody Allen (born 1935, US)
Thomas Pynchon (born 1937, US) – V., The Crying of Lot 49, Gravity's Rainbow
Richard Ingrams (born 1937, England)
John Kennedy O'Toole (born 1937, US)
George Carlin (1937–2008, US) – stand-up comedian
Peter Cook (1937–1995, England) – of the Satire boom, Beyond the Fringe
Eleanor Bron (born 1938, England)
David Frost (1939–2013, England)
Grigori Gorin (1940–2000, Soviet Union/Russia)
Frank Zappa (1940–1993, US) – We're Only in It for the Money, Cruising with Ruben and the Jets
Sergei Dovlatov (1941–1990, Soviet Union/Russia)
Kioumars Saberi Foumani (کیومرث صابری فومنی, 1941–2004, Iran)
Neil Innes (1944–2019, England) – former Bonzo Dog Doo-Dah Band founder and member of The Rutles. Writer of satirical songs and books
Gennady Khazanov (born 1945, Soviet Union/Russia) – stand-up comedian
Luba Goy (born 1945, Canada)
Roger Abbott (born 1946, Canada) – sketch comedian. 
Lewis Grizzard (born 1946, US)
Sue Townsend (1946–2014, England) – Adrian Mole
Don Ferguson (born 1946, Canada)
Jonathan Meades (born 1947, England) – writer, broadcaster and satirist
Terry Pratchett (1948–2015) – humorist and fantasy novelist, The Discworld book series
Lewis Black (born 1948, US) – stand-up comic, The Daily Show
Mikhail Zadornov (born 1948, Soviet Union/Russia)
Garry Trudeau (born 1948, US)
Jaafar Abbas (living, Sudan)
Christopher Guest (born 1948, US) – This Is Spinal Tap, Waiting for Guffman
Georg Schramm (born 1949, Germany) – Scheibenwischer, Neues aus der Anstalt, kabarett artist
Gary Larson (born 1950, US) – cartoonist
Fran Lebowitz (born 1950, US) – The Fran Lebowitz Reader, Public Speaking (film) – NYC public intellectual
Bailey White (born 1950, US)
Steve Bell (born 1951, England)
Bill Bryson (born 1951, US)
Al Franken (born 1951, US)
Douglas Adams (1952–2001, England) – The Hitchhiker's Guide to the Galaxy
Mary Walsh (born 1952, Canada)
Phil Hendrie (born 1952, US) – radio host of The Phil Hendrie Show
Robert Zubrin (born 1952, US)
Christopher Buckley (born 1952) – Thank You for Smoking, The White House Mess
Carl Hiaasen (born 1953) – Tourist Season, Double Whammy, Basket Case, Skinny Dip
Stoney Burke (born 1953, US)
Louis de Bernières (born 1954, UK) – Latin America Trilogy: The War of Don Emmanuel's Nether Parts, Señor Vivo and the Coca Lord, The Troublesome Offspring of Cardinal Guzman
Matt Groening (born 1954, US) – The Simpsons, Futurama
George C. Wolfe (born 1954, US) – The Colored Museum
Howard Stern (born 1954, US)
Jaspal Bhatti (1955–2012, India)
Cathy Jones (born 1955, Canada)
Bill Maher (born 1956, US) – Real Time with Bill Maher
Percival Everett (born 1956, US)
Ziad Rahbani (زياد الرحباني, born 1956, Lebanon)
David Sedaris (born 1956, US) – Naked, Me Talk Pretty One Day
Craig Brown (born 1957, UK)
Scott Adams (born 1957, US) – Dilbert
Stephen Fry (born 1957, England)
Christopher Moore (born 1957, US)
Victor Shenderovich (born 1958, Russia)
Ebrahim Nabavi (سید ابراهیم نبوی, born 1958, Iran), winner of Prince Claus Award (2005)
Bill Watterson (born 1958, US) – cartoonist, Calvin and Hobbes
Jello Biafra (born 1958, US)
George Saunders (born 1958, US) – author of CivilWarLand In Bad Decline, Tenth of December and Lincoln in the Bardo.
Wayne Federman (born 1959, US)
"Weird Al" Yankovic (born 1959, US) 
Hugh Laurie (born 1959, England)
Jeffrey Morgan (living, Canada) – CREEM, Metro Times
Denis Leary (born 1957, US)

Contemporary satirists (born 1960–present)
In alphabetical order (many birth dates not known):
Jacob M. Appel (US, born 1973) – playwright (Causa Mortis, Arborophilia)
Michael "Atters" Attree (born 1965, UK)
Max Barry (born 1973, Australia) – author
Paul Beatty (born 1962, US) – (The White Boy Shuffle, The Sellout)
Nigel Blackwell (living, UK) – Half Man Half Biscuit
Jan Böhmermann (born 1981, Germany)
Charlie Brooker (born 1971, UK) – Nathan Barley
Bo Burnham (born 1990, US) – comedian and musician
Dave Chappelle (born 1973, US) – stand-up comedian, Chappelle's Show
David Cross (born 1964, US) – Mr. Show, Arrested Development
Sacha Baron Cohen (born 1971) – Borat, Da Ali G Show
Stephen Colbert (born 1964, US) – The Colbert Report, The Daily Show
Sarah Cooper (born 1977, US) – blogger, vlogger, author, comedian 
Douglas Coupland (born 1961, Canada) – Generation X: Tales for an Accelerated Culture
Scott Dikkers (born 1965, US) – comedy writer and speaker
Bret Easton Ellis (born 1964, US) – screenwriter and director
Ricky Gervais (born 1961, UK) – comedian, creator of The Office (British TV series)
Sabina Guzzanti (born 1963, Italy) – satirist and writer
Bill Hicks (1961–1994, US) – stand-up comedian
Mishu Hilmy (living, US) – Good Morning Gitmo
Ian Hislop (born 1960, UK) – Private Eye
Jessica Holmes (born 1973, Canada) – comedian and actress
Armando Iannucci (born 1963, UK) – Brass Eye, The Day Today
Mike Judge (born 1962, US) – creator of Beavis and Butt-Head and King of the Hill
Elnathan John (born 1982, Nigeria) — Be(com)ing Nigerian: A Guide
Kennedy (born 1972, US) – radio personality and author
Hari Kondabolu (born 1982, US) – stand-up comic and film-maker
Erik Larsen (born 1962, US) – "Savage Dragon" comic book
Craig Lauzon (living, Canada) – comedian and caricaturist
Stewart Lee (born 1968, UK) – stand-up comedian and director
Victor Lewis-Smith (living, UK) – TV Offal
Chris Lilley (born 1974, Australia) – Summer Heights High, We Can Be Heroes: Finding The Australian of the YearDaniele Luttazzi (born 1961, Italy) – satirist and songwriter
Maddox (born 1978, US) – website The Best Page in the UniverseSeth MacFarlane (born 1973, US) – Family GuyScarlet Monahan (born 1983, UK) - British Satire 
Aaron McGruder (US) – The Boondocks (comic strip), The Boondocks (TV series)Rick Mercer (born 1969, Canada) – Rick Mercer ReportTim Minchin (born 1975, Australia) – comedian and musician
Mark Morford (living, US) – Notes and Errata, San Francisco Chronicle, SF GateChris Morris (born 1965, UK) – Brass Eye, The Day TodayGregory Motton (born 1961, UK) – playwright and author
The Moustache Brothers (Myanmar) – screwball comedy and dance
Bob Odenkirk (born 1962, US) – Mr. Show, Saturday Night Live, The Larry Sanders ShowJohn Oliver (born 1977, England) – Last Week Tonight with John OliverChuck Palahniuk (born 1962, US) – Fight Club and ChokeAlan Park (born 1962, Canada) – comedian and satirist
Trey Parker (born 1969, US) – South Park, Team America: World Police, The Book of MormonAlexandra Petri (born 1988, US) – author and columnist
Mark A. Rayner (living, Canada) – satirist and fiction writer
Pablo Reyes Jr (born 1989, US) – website The Daily Currant and Huzlers
Celia Rivenbark (living, US) – columnist and author
Joe Rogan (born 1967, US) – comedian and podcast pioneer
Eric Schwartz (living, US) – folk singer and satirist
Andrew Shaffer (living, US) – author
Amy Sedaris (born 1961, US) – actress and comedian
Sarah Silverman (born 1970, US) – stand-up comedian, The Sarah Silverman ProgramMartin Sonneborn (born 1965, Germany) – political jokester and satirist
Jon Stewart (born 1962, US) – The Daily ShowMatt Stone (born 1971, US) – South Park, The Book of MormonVermin Supreme (born 1961, US) – performance artist, comedian and political satirist
Greg Thomey (born 1961, Canada) – comedian and playwright
David Thorne (living, Australia) – humorist and satirist
Andrew Unger, (living, Canada) – Mennonite satirist
Jhonen Vasquez (born 1974, US) – Johnny the Homicidal Maniac, SqueeOliver Welke (born 1966, Germany) - heute-showMark Whitney (born 1959, US) – satirist and comedian
Howard X, (living, Hong Kong, Australia) – political satirist, musician, professional impersonator of Kim Jong-un
Bassem Youssef (باسم رأفت محمد يوسف, born 1974, Egypt) – comedian
Rucka Rucka Ali (born 1987, Israel) – political satirist, song parody maker

Notable satires in contemporary popular culture
In modern culture, much satire is often the work of several individuals collectively, as in magazines and television. Hence the following list.

Print

Astérix (French comic strip, satirizing both the Roman Empire era as well as 20th century life)
Benchley (US comic strip created by Mort Drucker and Jerry Dumas, satirizing Ronald Reagan and American culture)
Bone (US comic strip)
The Boondocks (US comic strip, satirizing African-American culture)
Le Canard enchaîné (weekly French satirical newspaper)
Charlie Hebdo (weekly French satirical paper)
The Chaser (Australian newspaper and TV shows)
Cho Ramaswamy (Thuglak – Tamil magazine)
Dilbert (US comic strip)
The Donald Duck and Uncle Scrooge comics by Carl Barks
Doonesbury (US comic strip)
The Fabulous Furry Freak Brothers (US comic strip)
Faux Faulkner contest (annually published in Hemispheres magazine until 2005)
Fritz the Cat by Robert Crumb
Humor Times (monthly US magazine)
Idées noires (Belgian comic strip)
Li'l Abner (US comic strip)
Life in Hell (US comic strip)
Mad (satirical comic book and magazine)
The Medium (weekly newspaper printed by students of Rutgers University)
Mr. Natural by Robert Crumb
Nero (Belgian comic strip)
The New Yorker (Shouts and Murmurs)
The Onion (US magazine)
Peanuts (US comic strip)
Pogo (US comic strip)
Private Eye (UK magazine)
The Inconsequential (UK magazine)
The Second Supper (US magazine)
The Tart (Fortnightly UK newspaper)
The Adventures of Tintin (Belgian comic strip)
Titanic (German magazine)
Tom Puss (Dutch comic strip)
Watchmen (American comic book series)

Television and radio

The Simpsons and Futurama (Matt Groening)
Howard Stern (radio personality "The Howard Stern Show")
The Daily Show with Jon Stewart (US Talk Show)
The Colbert Report (US Talk Show)
The Day Today (UK TV news parody by Chris Morris)
Brass Eye (UK current affairs TV-show parody by Chris Morris)
On the Hour (UK news radio parody by Chris Morris)
TV Offal (UK TV critique show by Victor Lewis-Smith)
This Hour Has 22 Minutes (Canadian TV show)
South Park (Trey Parker and Matt Stone)
The Chaser (Australian newspaper and TV shows)
Facelift (New Zealand Political show)
Spitting Image (UK TV show famous for its puppets of celebrities)
Yes Minister (also "Yes, Prime Minister" – UK TV show satirising government)
Kukly (Dolls, 1994–2002) – Russian satirical puppet show
Fitil (Fuse) – Soviet television satirical/comedy short film series
Nip/Tuck (Ryan Murphy)
Have I Got News For You – Long running UK TV panel show
Nathan Barley – 2005 UK TV satire by Chris Morris and Charlie Brooker.
The Chaser's War on Everything – Australian satire with an emphasis on attacking 'everyone'.
Seinfeld (Jerry Seinfeld)
Royal Canadian Air Farce (1993–2007) (Don Ferguson, Roger Abbott, Luba Goy)
Air Farce Live (2007–present) (Don Ferguson, Roger Abbott, Luba Goy)
Monty Python's Flying Circus
Phil Hendrie (radio personality "The Phil Hendrie Show")
Mock the Week – UK TV comedy panel show
The Larry Sanders Show – (Garry Shandling)
30 Rock – (Tina Fey)
Glenn Martin, DDS – A Nick@Nite show
Episodes – David Crane
Better Off Ted – (Victor Fresco)
Onion News Network
The Boondocks – (Aaron McGruder)
heute-show (German TV series)
The Amazing World of Gumball – Ben Bocquelet
Family Guy – (Seth MacFarlane)
On Cinema at the Cinema – (Tim Heidecke), Gregg Turkington)
The Fresh Prince of Bel-Air – (Andy Borowitz and Susan Borowitz)

Music

The Cover of "Rolling Stone" a satirical lament by Dr. Hook & the Medicine Show. 
"White America" is a satirical song by Eminem It is about his impact in rap and the impact of rap in the white communities.
"Mercedes Benz" is a McClure-Joplin song sung by Janis Joplin
Culturcide's album Tacky Souvenirs of Pre-Revolutionary America overdubbed new, satirical lyrics onto such pop hits as "We Are the World".
Vaporwave, a satirical music genre with anarcho-capitalist and cyberpunk overtones dedicated to (anti-)consumerism.
Mark Russell is an American political satirist known for his many appearances on PBS
Peter Gabriel's song The Barry Williams Show satirizes talk shows which showcase domestic topics of a taboo or shocking nature (and the viewing public's fascination with such content).
Chumbawamba have consistently used satire to make political points throughout their musical career.
Pink Floyd's albums Animals and The Dark Side of the Moon are conceptual and satirical albums.
The Lonely Island is a satirical music group known for their work on Saturday Night Live.
Trey Parker, Robert Lopez and Matt Stone's Tony-sweeping Broadway show The Book of Mormon (musical) satirizes the applicability of first-world religion to third-world problems.
The Dead Milkmen is a satirical punk rock/cowpunk band from the early 1980s.
Ben Folds, a rock pianist, and his group, Ben Folds Five, have multiple songs including satirical elements. Some of them being, "Underground", "Sports and Wine", and "Rock Star".
Dead Kennedys, an American punk band, often used satire in their songs, most notably Kill the Poor.
Frank Zappa and the Mothers of Invention's We're Only in It for the Money.

FilmBlazing Saddles, a 1974 comedy movie directed by Mel Brooks, satirizing racismCasino Royale, a 1967 surrealistic satire on the James Bond series and the entire spy genre.Get OutThis Is Spinal Tap, a satire on heavy metal culture and "rockumentaries"The Very Same Munchhausen, a 1979 satire of the late Soviet societyCluelessAmerican Beauty, a 1999 satire of life in the suburbsThank You for SmokingTeam America: World Police is a 2004 film satirizing Hollywood action flicks as well as post-9/11 American foreign policy.Wag the DogThe Rules of AttractionBest in ShowI Heart HuckabeesStarship TroopersScary MovieDonald Trump's The Art of the Deal: The MovieDr. StrangelovePlanet of the ApesSouth Park: Bigger, Longer & Uncut, a film satirizing censorshipNetworkOtaku no Video, a 1993 anime satirizing the otaku subcultureAdaptation.BrazilS.O.B., a satire on Hollywood.ElectionNot Another Teen Movie, a satire of the teen film genreHarold & Kumar Go to White CastleHarold & Kumar Escape from Guantanamo BayCitizen RuthThe HospitalWeapons of Mass DistractionLittle ChildrenBulworthMan Bites DogThe Simpsons MovieSmile, a satire of beauty pageants and small-town lifeBob RobertsWar, Inc.Britannia HospitalFight Club, a dark satire on consumerism, cults, and extremismAmerican PsychoTropic ThunderSimon, satirical commentary on the effects of mass media in pop cultureAmerican History X satirizes race/racism in a contemporary settingThey LiveLand of the Dead, a satire of post-9/11 America state and of the Bush administrationThe Wicker Man, a satire on cults and religionThe Great Dictator, a satire on Adolf HitlerMonty Python's Life of Brian, a satire on miscommunication, religion and ChristianityThe Player, a satire of Hollywood, directed by Robert AltmanIn the Loop, a satire of the 2003 invasion of IraqElvis Gratton, a French Canadian/Québécois series depicting a satirical federalistFubarThe Man Who Knew Too LittleVideo gamesFalloutFallout 2Fallout 3Fallout: New VegasFallout 4, a satire on US consumer culture
, a satire on US consumer cultureGrand Theft AutoCrash: Mind over Mutant''

Internet

Adequacy.org
The Babylon Bee (Christian satire)
BBspot
The Best Page In The Universe
Coconut Kelz (South African satirical video blogger)
The Daily Mash (U.K. satirical news website)
The Daily Bonnet (Mennonite satire website)
Faking News (Indian news satire website)
The Hard Times
Huzlers
Landover Baptist Church (US website satirizing Fundamentalist Christians)
Latma
McSweeney's Internet Tendency
National Report
Jeremy Nell (South African cartoonist)
NewsBiscuit
The Onion
Pat Condell
Reductress
ScrappleFace
The Second Supper
The UnReal Times (Indian news satire website)
Uncyclopedia (satirical parody of Wikipedia)
Vote for the Worst

See also
List of satirical news websites

References

Satirists.